Gandiva (IAST: Gāṇḍīva) is a divine bow of Arjuna, one of the Pandavas from the Hindu epic Mahabharata. The bow was made by Brahma.

How Arjuna got the Gandiva 
Agni,  God of fire, wanted to devour the forest of Khandavaprastha, to regain his power and splendor. He had enlisted the help of the two heroes, Krishna and Arjuna. Arjuna was the best warrior and greatest archer of the world & all time and demanded from Agni a bow that would suit his strength, skill and the power of celestial weapons. 

Agni then requested Varuna to bless the heroes with the desired weapons. Varuna gave the Gandiva bow to Arjuna, as well as two quivers which would provide an inexhaustible number of arrows.

The weapon was dreaded by many during the Kurukshetra war, having defeated and killed many great warriors and the gods themselves.

Features

The Gandiva gives a wielder self confidence, self belief. The bow consisted of 108 celestial string, was endued with great energy and is believed to have the strength of one lakh bows. Gandiva was indestructible and was worshiped by the celestials and the Gandharvas.

Return to the gods
At the end of the Dvapara Yuga, Krishna departed the Earth and left for Vaikuntha. When Krishna was departing, he told Arjuna to rescue the people of Dwarika because he was submerging Dwarika under ocean. Arjuna temporarily could not string the bow, or remember the spells necessary in order to summon his celestial weapons when Dwarika was drowning. Arjuna knew that his time on earth was up as well, Vyasa had told him this event will happen and when it happens, Arjuna's work on earth is over. Later, the Pandavas retired and journeyed to the Himalayas. On their route, Agni came and asked Arjuna to return the Gandiva to Varuna, for it belonged to the gods. Arjuna obliged and dropped them in the waters of the sea. Thus the celestial bow was returned to the gods.

See also 

 Gandiveshwar Sthan
Vijaya

 Sharanga
 Pinaka

References
Metaphysically, Gandiva is the “bow of self-control.”  With it Arjuna was equipped for victory over “the sense soldiers of the blind king Mind.”  “Charioteered by God, he must rally the army of emperor Discrimination with its forces of virtue and its allies of spiritual perception.”  (Paramahansa Yogananda-ji’s commentary on XVIII:78)

External links
 http://www.sacred-texts.com/hin/m01/m01228.htm
 http://www.sacred-texts.com/hin/m04/m04043.htm

Mahabharata
Weapons in Hindu mythology
Bows (archery)